Johann Christoph Heilbronner (13 March 1706, in Ulm – 17 January 1745 (or c.1747), in Leipzig) was a German mathematical historian (Mathematikhistoriker) and theologian.

Literary works 
 Versuch einer Geschichte der Mathematik and Arithmetik, 1739
 Historia matheseos universae a mundo condito ad seculum post Chr. Nat. XVI (or Historia matheseos universae), 1742

These two books are the first books that named and used the phrase "mathematical history".

External links 
 Heilbronner, Johann Christoph von Moritz Cantor in: Allgemeine Deutsche Biographie, herausgegeben von der Historischen Kommission bei der Bayerischen Akademie der Wissenschaften, Band 11 (1880), S. 313.
  (German)

German historians of mathematics
18th-century German Christian theologians
1706 births
1745 deaths
German male non-fiction writers
18th-century German writers
18th-century German male writers